The Lebanon Commercial Historic District in Lebanon, Tennessee is a  historic district centered on the city's public square. It was listed on the National Register of Historic Places in 1999.  In 1999 it included 43 contributing buildings and one other contributing structure.

The district is built on the Philadelphia Square Plan and is considered an excellent example of a commercial district from the late 19th and early 20th centuries.

References

Historic districts on the National Register of Historic Places in Tennessee
Beaux-Arts architecture in Tennessee
Italianate architecture in Tennessee
Geography of Wilson County, Tennessee
National Register of Historic Places in Wilson County, Tennessee
1999 establishments in Tennessee